Almost everything about Neanderthal behaviour remains controversial. From their physiology, Neanderthals are presumed to have been omnivores, but animal protein formed the majority of their dietary protein, showing them to have been carnivorous apex predators and not scavengers. Although very little is known of their social organization, it appears patrilines would make up the nucleus of the tribe, and women would seek out partners in neighbouring tribes once reaching adolescence, presumably to avoid inbreeding. The men would pass knowledge and customs down from fathers to sons. Neanderthal women appear to heavily skew physically impressive neanderthal men, hinting that neanderthal men would compete with each other and polyamorous relationships would emerge.

The quality of stone tools at archaeological sites suggests Neanderthals were good at "expert" cognition, a form of observational learning and practice – acquired through apprenticeship – that relies heavily on long-term procedural memory. Neanderthal toolmaking changed little over hundreds of thousands of years. The lack of innovation may imply a reduced capacity for thinking by analogy and less working memory. Researchers have speculated that Neanderthal behaviour would probably seem neophobic, dogmatic and xenophobic to modern humans,  and of a degree of rationality. There is genetic evidence that supports interbreeding with Homo sapiens, language capability (including the FOXP2 gene), archaeological signs of cultural development and potential for cumulative cultural evolution. Few Neanderthals lived past the age of 35.

Language

It is not known whether Neanderthals were anatomically capable of speech and whether they spoke. The only bone in the vocal tract is the hyoid, but it is so fragile that no Neanderthal hyoid was found until 1983, when excavators discovered a well-preserved one on Neanderthal Kebara 2, Israel. It was largely similar to that of living humans. Although the original excavators claimed that the similarity of this bone with that of living humans implied Neanderthals were anatomically capable of speech, it is not possible to reconstruct the vocal tract with information supplied by the hyoid. In particular, it does not allow to determine if the larynx of its owner was in a low-lying position, a feature considered important in producing speech.

A 2013 study on the Kebara hyoid used X-ray microtomography and finite element analysis to conclude that the Neanderthal hyoid showed microscopic features more similar to a modern human's hyoid than to a chimpanzee hyoid. To the authors, that suggested the Neanderthal hyoid was used similarly to that in living humans, that is, to produce speech. Because the authors did not compare the microscopic structure of the Kebara 2 hyoid with that of speech-hindered living humans, the result is not yet conclusive.

Although some researchers think Neanderthal tool-making is too complex for them not to have had language, tool-making experiments of Levallois technology, the most common Neanderthal toolmaking technique, have found that living humans can learn it in silence.

Neanderthals had the same DNA-coding region of the FOXP2 gene as living humans, but are different in one position of the gene's regulatory regions, and the extent of FOXP2 expression might hence have been different in Neanderthals. Although the gene appears necessary for language, it is not sufficient. It is not known whether FOXP2 evolved for or in conjunction with language, nor whether there are other language-related genes that Neanderthals may or may not have had. Similarly, the size and functionality of the Neanderthal Broca's and Wernicke's areas, used for speech generation in modern humans, is debated.

In 1998, researchers suggested Neanderthals had a hypoglossal canal at least as large as humans, suggesting they had part of the neurological requirements for language. The canal carries the hypoglossal nerve, which controls the muscles of the tongue, necessary to produce language. However, a Berkeley research team showed no correlation between canal size and speech, as several extant non-human primates and fossilized australopithecines have larger hypoglossal canals.

The morphology of the outer and middle ear of Homo heidelbergensis, the Neanderthal's ancestor, suggests they had an auditory sensitivity similar to modern humans and different from chimpanzees.

Tools
Neanderthal and early anatomically modern human archaeological sites show a simpler toolkit than those found in Upper Paleolithic sites, produced by modern humans after about 50,000 BP. In both early anatomically modern humans and Neanderthals, there is little innovation in the technology. In 2020 a 50,000-year-old three-ply cord fragment made from bark was found at the Abri du Maras, France site. Bruce Hardy of Kenyon College, Ohio, concluded that the creation of the cord suggested a cognitive understanding of numeracy and context-sensitive operational memory.

Tools produced by Middle Palaeolithic humans in Eurasia (both Neanderthals and early modern humans) are known as Mousterian. These were often produced using soft hammer percussion, with hammers made of materials like bones, antlers, and wood, rather than hard hammer percussion, using stone hammers. A result of this is that their bone industry was relatively simple. They routinely made stone implements. Neanderthal tools consisted of stone flakes and task-specific hand axes, many of which were sharp.

There is evidence of violence among Neanderthals. The 40,000-year-old Neanderthal skull of St. Césaire has a healed fracture in its cranial vault likely caused by something sharp, suggesting interpersonal violence. The wound healed and the Neanderthal survived.

Whether they had projectile weapons is controversial. They seem to have had wooden spears, but it is unclear whether they were used as projectiles or as thrusting spears.  Wood implements rarely survive, but several 320,000-year-old wooden spears about 2 metres in length were found near Schöningen, northern Germany, and are thought to be the product of the older Homo heidelbergensis species.

Neanderthals used fire on occasion, but it is not certain whether they were able to produce it. They may have used pyrolusite (manganese dioxide) to accelerate the combustion of wood. "With archaeological evidence for fireplaces and the conversion of the manganese dioxide to powder, [it has been argued] that Neanderthals at Pech-de-l’Azé I used manganese dioxide in fire-making and produced fire on demand." MnO2 lowers the combustion temperature of wood from 350 degrees Celsius to 250 degrees Celsius and is common in Neanderthal archaeological sites.

Neanderthals produced birch tar through the dry distillation of birch bark. It was long thought  that birch tar made by Neanderthals required them to follow a complex recipe and that it thus showed complex cognitive skills (to arrive at this recipe) and cultural transmission (of this recipe). A study from 2019 showed that birch tar production can instead be a very simple process - merely involving the burning of birch bark near smooth vertical surfaces in open-air conditions.

Pendants and other jewellery showing traces of ochre dye and deliberate grooving have also been found in one single stratigraphically disturbed Neanderthal archaeological layer, but whether these items were ever in the hands of Neanderthals or were mixed into their archaeological layers from overlying modern human ones is debated.

Burial claims

No claim of a deliberate Neanderthal burial is universally accepted. An interpretation of pre-Neanderthal Shanidar IV as having been ritually buried with flowers was seriously questioned in the past, and to Paul B. Pettitt, convincingly eliminated: "A recent examination of the microfauna from the strata into which the grave was cut suggests that the pollen was deposited by the burrowing rodent Meriones tersicus (Persian jird), which is common in the Shanidar microfauna and whose burrowing activity can be observed today".

However, further excavations of the site which began in 2014 led to new discoveries and multiple lines of evidence that the Neanderthal was deliberately buried, including the fact that the sediment layer around the body is visibly different to the layer below. Additionally, the sediment below the body shows signs of having been disturbed by digging. According to Emma Pomeroy of the University of Cambridge, “That’s quite good evidence that something was dug out and that’s what the body’s been put in.”

Diet

Neanderthals obtained protein in their diet from animal sources. Evidence-based isotope studies show that Neanderthals ate primarily meat. Neanderthals were probably apex predators, and fed predominantly on deer, namely red deer and reindeer, as they were the most abundant game, but also on ibex, wild boar, aurochs, and less frequently mammoth, straight-tusked elephant and woolly rhinoceros.

Traces of fossilized plants have been extracted from Neanderthal teeth tartar found in Belgium and Iraq, suggesting they also consumed plants.

Burned food remnants, thought to be about 70,000 years old, were found in the Shanidar Caves, 500 miles north of Baghdad. Dr Ceren Kabukcu, an archaeobotanist at the University of Liverpool said, 'We present evidence for the first time of soaking and pounding pulse seeds by both Neanderthals and early modern humans.'

Cannibalism
Neanderthals are thought to have practised cannibalism or ritual defleshing. This hypothesis was formulated after researchers found marks on Neanderthal bones similar to the bones of a dead deer butchered by Neanderthals.

Neanderthal bones from various sites (Combe-Grenal and Abri Moula in France, Krapina in Croatia and Grotta Guattari in Italy) have all been cited as bearing cut marks made by stone tools. However, the results of technological tests have revealed varied causes.

Re-evaluation of these marks using high-powered microscopes, comparisons to contemporary butchered animal remains, and recent ethnographic cases of excarnation mortuary practises have shown that perhaps this was a case of ritual defleshing.
 At Grotta Guattari, the purposefully widened base of the skull (for access to the brain) is caused by carnivore action, with hyena tooth marks found on the skull and mandible.
 According to some studies, fragments of bones from Krapina show marks similar to those on bones from secondary burials at a Michigan ossuary (14th century AD), and are indicative of removing the flesh of a partially decomposed body.
 According to others, the marks on the bones found at Krapina are indicative of defleshing, although whether this was for nutritional or ritual purposes cannot be determined with certainty.

Evidence of cannibalism includes:
 Analysis of bones from Abri Moula in France does seem to suggest cannibalism was practised here. Cut-marks are concentrated in places expected in the case of butchery, instead of defleshing. Additionally, the treatment of the bones was similar to that of roe deer bones, assumed to be food remains, found in the same shelter.
 At El Sidron in Northern Spain, scientists have found evidence pointing to the cannibalism of 12 individuals by what is hypothesized to have been a neighbouring group of Neanderthals. According to Carles Lalueza-Fox of the Institute of Evolutionary Biology in Barcelona, the individuals (three children aged from two to nine, three teenagers, and six adults) appear to have been "killed and eaten, with their bones and skulls split open to extract the marrow, tongue and brains." Scientists speculate that the lack of any evidence of fire makes it likely that the event happened in winter, during times when food was scarce.

Evidence indicating cannibalism would not distinguish Neanderthals from modern humans, which are known to have practised cannibalism or mortuary defleshing (e.g., the sky burial of Tibet).

Claims of art and adornment

A large number of claims of Neanderthal art, adornment, and structures have been made, which would show Neanderthals were capable of symbolic thought and a degree of human rationality. However, none of them are widely accepted as evidence of symbolism, as the dating often interlaps with anatomically modern human presence in Europe. Some notable findings are listed below.

 Flower pollen on the body of pre-Neanderthal Shanidar 4, Iraq, had in 1975 been argued to be a flower burial, but the pollen could have also been deposited by natural events.
In 1975, a piece of flat flint with a piece of bone pushed through a hole on the midsection–dating to 32, 40, or 75 kya–has been purported to resemble the upper half of a face, with the bone representing eyes–the Mask of la Roche-Cotard. It is contested whether it represents a face, or if it even constitutes art.
Châtelperronian beads have been attributed to Neanderthals, but the dating is uncertain and the beads may have been made by modern humans.
 Bird bones were argued to show evidence for feather plucking in a 2012 study examining 1,699 ancient sites across Eurasia, which the authors controversially took to mean Neanderthals wore bird feathers as personal adornments.

 Deep scratches on the floor of  Gorham's Cave, Gibraltar, were dated to older than 39 kya in 2012, which some have controversially interpreted as Neanderthal abstract art.
 In 2015, a study argued that several 130,000-year-old eagle talons found in a cache near Krapina, Croatia along with Neanderthal bones, had been modified to be used as jewellery. A similar talon necklace was reported in 2019 at Cova Foradà in Spain.
Being so far inside the cave also shows the use of artificial lighting in underground environments. Other red-painted stalagmites in Spain were dated to 65,500 years ago.
In 2017, incision-decorated raven bones from the Zaskalnaya VI (Kolosovskaya) Neanderthal site, Crimea, Micoquian industry dated to 43–38 kya were reported. Given there are 17 of these objects at seven different sites in the area, and the notches on all of them are more or less equidistant to each other, they are very unlikely to have originated from simple butchering.
If the dating is correct, they were painted at least 20,000 years before the arrival of anatomically modern humans in western Europe, and demonstrate Neanderthals were capable of symbolic behaviour.
The Cave of Los Aviones in Spain has yielded ochred and perforated marine shells, red and yellow colourants, and shell "makeup containers" that feature residues of complex pigment mixtures. The pigments on the seashells were dated to 115,000 years old, making these "the oldest personal ornamentation known anywhere in the world," predating the presence of Homo sapiens.

References

Sources

External links

Behavior
Human behavior